Democratic Left, Democratic Left Party, or Party of the Democratic Left may refer to:

Political parties

Democratic Left (Ecuador)
Democratic Left (France)
Democratic Left (Greece)
Democratic Left (Ireland)
Democratic Party of the Left
Democrats of the Left
Democratic Left (Italy)
Democratic Left Movement (Lebanon)
Democratic Left Movement (Peru)
Democratic Left Alliance (Poland)
Democratic Left People's Party
Democratic Left Scotland
Party of the Democratic Left (Czech Republic)
Party of the Democratic Left (Slovakia)
 Party of the Democratic Left (2005) (Slovakia)
 Democratic Left (Spain)
Democratic Left Party (Turkey)
Democratic Left (UK)
Federation of the Democratic Left (Morocco)

Other uses
Democratic Left (newspaper), a quarterly publication printed by the Democratic Socialists of America